Flight to Mars may refer to:
Flight to Mars (film), a 1951 Cinecolor science fiction film
Flight to Mars (ride), a former amusement park ride in Seattle's Fun Forest
Flight to Mars, a UFO  tribute band, a side project of Pearl Jam lead guitarist Mike McCready

See also
 Exploration of Mars, uncrewed or hypothesized crewed flights
 Human mission to Mars